Intef, whose name is commonly accompanied by epithets such as the Elder, the Great (= Intef-aa) or born of Iku, was a Theban nomarch during the First Intermediate Period c. 2150 BC and later considered a founding figure of the 11th Dynasty, which eventually reunified Egypt.

Rule
Intef the Elder was not a pharaoh but rather the nomarch of Thebes c. 2150 BC. As such he would have nominally served either a king of the 8th Dynasty or one of the Herakleopolitan kings of 9th or 10th Dynasty. Intef the Elder would have controlled the territory from Thebes to Aswan to the south and not farther north than Coptos, which was then controlled by another dynasty of nomarchs. Intef is believed to be the father of his successor on the Theban throne, Mentuhotep I.

Attestations

Intef the Elder was seemingly perceived as a founding figure of the 11th Dynasty after his death. For example, his name figures in the chapel of royal ancestors (no. 13) erected at Karnak by Thutmose III over 600 years after Intef's death. In the chapel, Intef is given the titles of iry-pat ("Hereditary Prince") and haty-a ("Count"); here, his name does not appear enclosed by the cartouche, which is a pharaonic prerogative.
Intef the Elder is probably to be identified with the "Intef-aa born of Iku", to whom Senusret I dedicated a seated statue representing Intef as a scribe:

Intef the Elder was also the object of private cults, as shown by the stele of Maati, a minor official of Mentuhotep II, which is now in the Metropolitan Museum of Art (inv. no. 14.2.7). On his stele Maati asks that prayers be told for "Intef the Elder the son of Iku". Intef may also be mentioned on a funerary stele found at Dendera, but most likely originating from the Theban Necropolis of Dra' Abu el-Naga'. This fragmented stele, the two pieces of which are now in Strasbourg (inv. no. 345) and in Florence (inv. no. 7595), belonged to a minor official also named Intef, who was chosen by his namesake lord to attend a meeting of nomarchs in his place. The stele gives Intef the Elder the title of "Great overlord of Upper Egypt", from which it was deduced that the southernmost districts of Thebes, once the stronghold of Ankhtifi's family, had since been conquered by the Theban-Coptite coalition. The attribution of this stele to Intef the Elder is debated.

Given the importance of Intef the Elder in the eyes of his successors, Alan Gardiner proposed that Intef the Elder was mentioned on the Turin canon in column 5 line 12. This remains conjectural however as this section of the papyrus is completely missing.

Tomb
Auguste Mariette unearthed a stele of the "hereditary prince Intefi" at Dra' Abu el-Naga' on the west bank of Thebes and now in the Egyptian Museum CG 20009. 
The stele gives the titles of Intef and shows that he served an unnamed pharaoh:

Jürgen von Beckerath believes this stele was Intef's funerary stele, originally placed in a chapel near his tomb.

References

Further reading

Officials of the Eleventh Dynasty of Egypt
Nomarchs